Cirsium peckii, the Steens Mountain thistle, is a very spiny and prickly perennial plant in the family Asteraceae that grows in the Great Basin of the western United States.

Growth pattern

Leaves and stems
Leaves are lanceolate and deeply divided, with sharp, pointed, yellow needle-like teeth on the points of lobes, and are either hairless or have sparse hairs on the midrib.

Inflorescence and fruit
Light lavender heads of flowers are clustered at the base of the leaves along the upper part of the stem.

It flowers from June to August.

Range and habitat

Etymology
Morton Peck was a 20th-century professor of botany at Willamette University and author of A Manual of the Higher Plants of Oregon.

References

peckii
Taxa named by Louis Forniquet Henderson